Damiete Herbert Miller served as the Commissioner of Social Welfare and Rehabilitation in the First Executive Council of Governor Ezenwo Nyesom Wike. He was reappointed to the same position in September 2017.

References

Living people
Commissioners of ministries of Rivers State
First Wike Executive Council
Year of birth missing (living people)